Top of the Town is a 1937 American comedy film directed by Ralph Murphy, Sam White and Walter Lang and starring Doris Nolan.

Cast
 Doris Nolan as Diana Borden
 George Murphy as Ted Lane
 Ella Logan as Dorine
 Hugh Herbert as Hubert
 Gerald Oliver Smith as Borden Executive
 Mischa Auer as Hamlet
 Gregory Ratoff as J.J. Stone
 Peggy Ryan as Peggy
 J. Scott Smart as Beaton (as Jack Smart)
 Ray Mayer as Roger
 Henry Armetta as Bacciagalluppi
 Gertrude Niesen as Gilda Norman
 Claude Gillingwater as William Borden
 Ernest Cossart as Augustus Borden
 Samuel S. Hinds as Henry Borden
 Richard Carle as Edwin Borden
 California Collegians as Singing Group
 The Four Esquires as Performers

Reception
Writing for Night and Day in 1937, Graham Greene gave the film a poor review, describing it as "one of those distressingly carefree musicals [...] when the only ungay faces are among the audience".

References

External links
 

1937 films
1937 comedy films
American comedy films
American black-and-white films
Films directed by Walter Lang
Films directed by Ralph Murphy
1930s English-language films
1930s American films
English-language comedy films